The Cowon D2 is a portable media player designed and marketed by Cowon Systems, Inc. The D2, released on December 5, 2006, was Cowon's first portable media player using a touchscreen as the main means of navigation. It has since been discontinued.

Specifications

Other features include Flash Lite, a text viewer, voice recording, FM radio with recording, TV-out, optional DMB and DAB compatibility, and an SDHC card slot.

D2+
On February 23, 2009, Cowon announced the release of the D2+, an updated version of the D2 with an improved user interface and updated sound effects. It featured a new case design, but otherwise largely the same hardware, making it possible to port the new D2+ interface to the original D2.

References

External links
COWONGLOBAL.com
iAudiophile.net

Products introduced in 2007
Portable media players
Digital audio players
Touchscreen portable media players